Sylvain Grysolle (12 December 1915 – 19 January 1985) was a Belgian cyclist. He won the Omloop Het Nieuwsblad in 1948, the 1945 Tour of Flanders, and the 1941 La Flèche Wallonne.

Major results

1935
 1st Schaal Sels
1936
 1st Schaal Sels
 8th Paris–Roubaix
1937
 1st Scheldeprijs
 1st Grote Prijs Stad Zottegem
1938
 1st Kampioenschap van Vlaanderen
 1st Omloop der Vlaamse Gewesten
 8th Paris–Roubaix
1939
 1st Stage 2 Tour of Belgium
 3rd GP Stad Vilvoorde
 6th Paris–Roubaix
 7th Tour of Flanders
 9th Overall Deutschland Tour
1st Stages 4, 17B, 18 & 19
 10th Liège–Bastogne–Liège
1940
 2nd GP Stad Vilvoorde
1941
 1st La Flèche Wallonne
 2nd Grote Prijs Stad Zottegem
1942
 3rd Grote 1-MeiPrijs
 3rd Grote Prijs Stad Zottegem
 4th Tour of Flanders
1943
 4th Tour of Flanders
1944
 1st Grote 1-MeiPrijs
 1st Stage 2 Tour of Belgium
 2nd Ronde van Limburg
1945
 1st Tour of Flanders
 1st Kampioenschap van Vlaanderen
 2nd Overall Tour of Belgium
1st Stage 1
 4th Liège–Bastogne–Liège
 8th La Flèche Wallonne
1946
 1st Circuit des Onze Villes
 2nd Paris–Brussels
1947
 1st Stage 1B GP des Routiers Prior
 8th Gent–Wevelgem
1948
 1st Omloop Het Volk

References

1915 births
1985 deaths
Belgian male cyclists
Cyclists from East Flanders
People from Wichelen